Christian Alejandro Nava Sánchez (born 10 December 1982) is a Mexican politician from the Institutional Revolutionary Party. In 2012 he served as Deputy of the LXI Legislature of the Mexican Congress representing Morelos.

References

1982 births
Living people
Politicians from Morelos
People from Cuautla
Institutional Revolutionary Party politicians
21st-century Mexican politicians
Deputies of the LXI Legislature of Mexico
Members of the Chamber of Deputies (Mexico) for Morelos